Senkamanisken was a Kushite King who ruled from 640 to 620 BC at Napata. He used royal titles based on those of the ancient Egyptian pharaohs.

Biography
He might have been married to queens Amanimalel and Nasalsa, the latter of whom bore him two sons: Anlamani and Aspelta. Both sons would ultimately assume the Kushite throne after his death at Napata, Nubia's capital city. His pyramid is Nu.3 in Nuri.

Statues of Senkamanisken have been found buried or hidden in the Jebel Barkal, presumably due to Psamtik II's attack on Kush in 592 BC. A sphinx has also been found which was inscribed with his name. Objects bearing the name of this king have also been found in Meroë indicating that he placed a degree of importance to this site which would be the political capital of the Kushite kingdom after Psamtik II's sack of Napata in 592 BC.

He is the only Nubian king after the 25th Dynasty known from an inscription found in Egypt. He appears on a fragment of an offering table from Memphis.

Artifacts

Temple B700 at Jebel Barkal
He also decorated Temple B700 (started by Aspelta) at Jebel Barkal, where he is shown clubbing enemies.

The hieroglyphic inscription on the Temple described the role of God Amun in selecting Sekamanisken as king:

References

External links

 Senkamanisken

7th-century BC monarchs of Kush
7th-century BC rulers